Baseball had its second appearance as an official medal sport at the 1996 Summer Olympics in Atlanta, United States, with games played at Atlanta–Fulton County Stadium.  Eight nations competed, with the preliminary phase consisting of each team playing every other team.  Playoffs were then held, with the four highest ranked teams advancing.  For the semifinals, the 1st place team played the 4th place team and the 2nd place team played against the 3rd place team.  The winners of those semifinals competed against each other for the gold medal, with the loser getting the silver medal.  The teams defeated in the semifinal played a match for the bronze medal.

Baseball was an event open only to amateurs for the second and last time. Meanwhile, Cuba used its best players as they were amateurs in name only, with all necessary funding coming from the state.

Medalists

Teams
  (Hosts)
  (1995 Asian Baseball Championship gold medalist)
  (1995 Asian Baseball Championship silver medalist)
  (1991 European Baseball Championship gold medalist)
  (1991 European Baseball Championship silver medalist)
  (1995 Pan American games gold medalist)
  (1995 Pan American games silver medalist)
  (Oceania Baseball Championship gold medalist, defeat 1995 Africa Cup Baseball Championship  in a playoff)

Preliminary round

Day 1 (July 20)

Day 2 (July 21)

Day 3 (July 22)

Day 4 (July 23)

Day 5 (July 24)

Day 6 (July 25)

Day 7 (July 27)

Day 8 (July 28)

Day 9 (July 29)

Day 10 (July 30)

Knockout round

Semifinals (August 1)

Bronze medal match (August 2)

Final (August 2)

Final standing

Sources
Official Olympic Report via Wayback Machine

References

External links
 Atlanta 1996 Baseball Men Results at Olympics.com

 
1996 Summer Olympics events
1996
Olympics
1996
Men's events at the 1996 Summer Olympics
Baseball competitions in Atlanta